The Grotte aux Fées ("Cave of the Fairies") in the cliffs above Saint-Maurice, Switzerland is a natural limestone solution show cave, featuring a  high underground waterfall, claimed as the world's highest waterfall in a show cave. The cave was the first show cave in Switzerland. The cave was known until the mid 19th century as the Trou aux Fayes or "Sheep Hole," as it was used as a sheepfold. The cave was known from Roman times, but was first publicized in 1863 as a tourist attraction, with the present name being used from 1865.

The cave was explored in 1831 when a party mapped  of passages. From 1863 Professor Chanoine Gard of the Abbey College of Saint-Maurice cleared passageways and conducted tours on behalf of an orphanage that he had founded. From 1865 the cave was operated by the Sisters of Saint-Maurice, who coined the present name. In 1925 additional exploration extended the cave network from the top of the waterfall.

The guided tour follows a  trail, ending at the waterfall. The waterfall is fed by water from the nearby Dents du Midi peaks.

The cave was connected to Fort du Scex, which occupies the same cliff, between 1935 and 1936.  The cave in turn was connected to Fort de Cindey between 1941 and 1946, forming part of the fortifications of Fortress Saint-Maurice and providing an underground connection between the two fortifications. The cave and both forts may be visited during summer months.

References

External links

 Grotte aux Fées website
 Grotte aux Fées at speleo-lausanne.com 

Caves of Switzerland
Show caves in Switzerland
Fortress Saint-Maurice
Tourist attractions in Valais
Landforms of Valais